The Eternal Mother is a surviving 1912 American short silent drama film directed by D. W. Griffith and starring Blanche Sweet. The film was shot in Fort Lee, New Jersey when Biograph Company and other early film studios in America's first motion picture industry were based there at the beginning of the 20th century.

Cast
 Edwin August as John, the Husband
 Blanche Sweet as Martha, the Wife
 Mabel Normand as Mary, the Woman
 Charles Hill Mailes as Mary's Father
 Kate Bruce as An Old Woman
 Donald Crisp as In Field
 Guy Hedlund as A Friend
 J. Jiquel Lanoe as A Friend
 Jeanie MacPherson as In Field

See also
 List of American films of 1912
 D. W. Griffith filmography
 Blanche Sweet filmography

References

External links

The Eternal Mother available for free download at Internet Archive

1912 films
1912 drama films
1912 short films
Silent American drama films
American silent short films
American black-and-white films
Biograph Company films
Films directed by D. W. Griffith
Films shot in Fort Lee, New Jersey
Articles containing video clips
1910s American films
Surviving American silent films
1910s English-language films